Ikhlas Fakhri Imarah (born 1940) is an Egyptian poet and university teacher. She was born in the town of Al Qalaj in Qalyubia Governorate, and self-educated, then attended the Dar al-Ulum, Cairo University. She then worked as a professor at Faiyum Branch of Cairo University. 
Published some poetic collections and historical and critical literary studies.

Works 
 As well as men, poetry collection, 1990.
 The Migratory Bird, poetry collection, 1991.
 Pre-Islamic poetry between tribal and subjective study.
 A Critical Reading in Contemporary Arabic Poetry.
 Islam and Poetry 1992 
 Nostalgia and alienation in the Mahjar poets
 Shafiq Maalouf's Poetry, PhD Thesis.
 On the art of storytelling
 Crying for the homeland and Arabism

References 

1940 births
Living people
Cairo University alumni
Egyptian women poets
20th-century Egyptian poets
21st-century Egyptian poets
Academic staff of King Abdulaziz University
Academic staff of Umm al-Qura University
Egyptian emigrants to Saudi Arabia